Pyrnus or Pyrnos was a coastal polis (city-state) of ancient Caria and belonged to the Rhodian Peraia.
It was a member of the Delian League.
 
Its site is located near Büyükkaraağaç, Muğla Province, Turkey.

References

Populated places in ancient Caria
Former populated places in Turkey
Greek city-states
Members of the Delian League
Ancient Rhodes
Greek colonies in Caria
History of Muğla Province